is one of the two  of Kodokan Judo. It is intended as an illustration of the various concepts of  that exist in judo, and is used both as a training method and as a demonstration of understanding.

History

The katame-no-kata was developed by Jigoro Kano as a method of illustrating principles of grappling to allow students to more effectively apply them in randori. Initially, the kata consisted of ten techniques. These were subsequently appended, bringing the number to fifteen.

The Katame no Kata was developed at the Kodokan between 1884 and 1887 following the development of the Nage no Kata. It is composed of three groups of grappling techniques each with five representative techniques. Your goal is to acquire the methods of controlling your opponent in your practice of Katame No Kata.

Description

The katame-no-kata consists of fifteen techniques, grouped in three categories:

Osae-komi-waza
The five holding techniques demonstrated in Katame no Kata are:
Kesa-gatame (in the Kuzure-kesa-gatame variant) (袈裟固)
Kata-gatame (肩固)
Kami-shiho-gatame (上四方固)
Yoko-shiho-gatame (横四方固)
Kuzure-kami-shiho-gatame (崩上四方固)

Shime waza
The five chokes demonstrated are:
Kata-juji-jime (片十字絞)
Hadaka-jime (裸絞)
Okuri-eri-jime (送襟絞)
Kata ha jime (片羽絞)
Gyaku-juji-jime (逆十字絞)

Kansetsu waza
The five joint locks demonstrated are:
Ude-garami (腕緘)
Ude-hishigi-juji-gatame (腕挫十字固)
Ude-hishigi-ude-gatame (腕挫腕固)
Ude-hishigi-hiza-gatame (腕挫膝固)
Ashi-garami (足緘)

Videos of katame-no-kata 

 Katame-no-kata demonstration from Poland, filmed in 2006.  No narration, but there is background music.  Participants are identified as "Niedomagala and Nowakowski."

References  

 Jigoro Kano, Kodokan Judo, Kodansha International.
 Tadao Otaki and F. Draeger, Judo Formal Techniques, Tuttle Martial Arts.

External links
 Katame-no-kata page on the JudoInfo site with instructions and photos.

Judo kata